Seven ships of the Royal Navy have been named HMS Fearless:

 was a 12-gun gunvessel launched in 1794 and wrecked in 1804 in Plymouth Sound in the company of a dockyard lighter. Heavy weather forced both vessels to cut from Cawsand Bay and drove them ashore near Redding Point. That only one man was lost was due to the efforts of Cawsands fishermen with lanterns and ropes.  
 was a 12-gun gun-brig  launched in 1804 and wrecked, without loss of life, in 1812 on rocks of Cape St Sebastian near Cadiz.  
 was a wooden paddlewheel survey vessel, formerly the GPO's Flamer transferred and renamed in 1837, and broken up in 1875.  
 was a torpedo cruiser launched in 1886 and sold in 1905.  
 was an  scout cruiser launched in 1912 and scrapped in 1921.
 was an F-class destroyer launched in 1934. She was damaged by aircraft and scuttled in 1941.  
 was a  launched in 1963. She participated in the Falklands War and the Gulf War, and was paid off in 2002.

Battle honours

 Heligoland 1914
 Jutland 1916
 Norway 1940
 Atlantic 1941
 Malta Convoys 1941
 Mediterranean 1941
 Falkland Islands 1982

See also
 A fictional helicopter assault ship named HMS Fearless appears in the Axis of Time books.
 Two fictional Royal Manticoran Navy warships commanded by Honor Harrington are called HMS Fearless - a light cruiser that appears in On Basilisk Station and a heavy cruiser that appears in The Honor of the Queen, both books by David Weber.
 A fictional man-of-war named HMS Fearless appears in the game Assassin's Creed IV: Black Flag alongside the ship Royal Sovereign as one of the game's four "Legendary Ship" battles.

References

Gossett, William Patrick (1986) The lost ships of the Royal Navy, 1793-1900. (London: Mansell). 

Royal Navy ship names